Robert Ehrlich, the founder of Pirates Booty, is an American entrepreneur and an ex-commodities trader. Ehrlich founded Robert's American Gourmet Food, a manufacturer of organic snack foods which includes Pirate's Booty.

Ehrlich started his company after seeing a bag of cheese puffs that contained no cheese, which inspired the Pirate's Booty line of snacks, eventually growing to a $50 million business. He later founded Vegan Rob's, which produces vegan and gluten free snacks such as vegan cheese puffs and popcorn.

References

External links
 CNN: "Ay, matey, Pirate's Booty hopes mascot sells snacks."
 Happy crisps fight depression, BBC News
 The Better Binge, Detroit Metro Times

Living people
American food company founders
American commodities traders
Year of birth missing (living people)